Hélène Tréheux-Duchêne (born 7 January 1963), is a French career diplomat who, since 2022, serves as the Ambassador of France to the United Kingdom.

Biography 
The daughter of Professor Jacques Tréheux and Augusta née Beauchot, she read modern literature at ENS Paris and after graduating she pursued further studies at Sciences Po then at ENA where she met her future husband, Rémi Duchêne. 

After joining the French diplomatic service at the Quai d'Orsay in 1989, she rose quickly through the ranks via various EU postings to become France's Permanent Representative to NATO (2016–19).

Honours 
  Chevalier, Légion d'honneur
  Chevalier, Ordre national du Mérite.

See also 

 List of Ambassadors of France to the United Kingdom

References

External links 
 www.diplomatie.gouv.fr

1963 births
Living people
People from Lorraine
Sciences Po alumni
École nationale d'administration alumni
Ambassadors of France to the United Kingdom
Chevaliers of the Légion d'honneur
Knights of the Ordre national du Mérite
French women ambassadors